Jon L. Mills (born July 24, 1947) is an American lawyer and former politician.

Education 
Mills earned a B.A. from Stetson University in 1969. He went on to the University of Florida College of Law where he graduated second overall in 1972. While at the Levin College of Law, he served on the Florida Law Review, and was a member of Florida Blue Key. Before Mills became the Dean (education) of the Levin College of Law, he served as a Professor at the University of Florida in 1995.

Work 
Mills' main focus is on appellate litigation. He has appeared in courts throughout the United States on issues ranging from international jurisdiction, constitutionality of presidential budget cutbacks, the constitutionality of laws protecting victim's privacy, constitutionality of a Governor's gaming compact with Indians, to the constitutionality of proposed constitutional initiatives.

Mills is Dean Emeritus, Professor of Law, and Director of Center for Governmental Responsibility at the University of Florida Fredric G. Levin College of Law. He served as Dean of the College from 1999 to 2003. As a researcher and teacher, he has been a principal investigator and directed major studies attracting over six million dollars in grants on environmental and constitutional issues including international projects in Brazil, Poland, Haiti, and Central America.

In addition to teaching at the College of Law, he has taught and lectured in Constitutional Law, International Trade and Environment in Costa Rica, Brazil, the University of Warsaw and Cambridge University.

Mills has served as the director of the Center for Governmental Responsibility and was a member of the Florida House of Representatives from Gainesville, starting in 1978. He served as Speakder of the House during the legislature's 1986-88 session.

Activities 
Fellow of American Bar Foundation, The Florida Bar; Order of the Coif; Phi Kappa Phi; Florida Supreme Court Historical Society; Florida Supreme Court Professionalism Commission. Kennedy School of Government, Harvard University (1987).

References

External links 
Dean Mills's Official Bio
Jon L. Mills Bio on Boies, Schiller, & Flexner LLP

|-

|-

Living people
University of Florida faculty
Deans of law schools in the United States
University of Florida alumni
Members of the Florida House of Representatives
Speakers of the Florida House of Representatives
1947 births